Ichi-Ban is an album by the Louis Hayes – Junior Cook Quintet featuring Woody Shaw recorded in 1976 and released on the Dutch Timeless label and on Timeless Muse in the U.S.

Reception 

The Allmusic review stated "The limited recording time (under forty minutes) is a shame since the group is such a pleasure to hear. The music retains its excitement years after it was recorded, a tribute to both the choice of tunes and the quality of playing".

Track listing 
 "Ichi-Ban" (Ronnie Matthews) – 5:56
 "Pannonica" (Thelonious Monk) – 4:48
 "Brothers and Sisters" (Tex Allen) – 7:21
 "The Moontrane" (Woody Shaw) – 7:06
 "Book's Bossa" (Walter Booker) – 12:26

Personnel 
Louis Hayes – drums
Junior Cook – tenor saxophone
Woody Shaw – trumpet (tracks 1 & 3–5)
Ronnie Mathews – piano
Stafford James – bass
Guilherme Franco – percussion

References 

Louis Hayes albums
Junior Cook albums
1976 albums
Timeless Records albums